Mumbai Indians (MI) is a franchise cricket team based in Mumbai, India, which plays in the Indian Premier League (IPL). They were one of the eight teams that competed in the 2008 Indian Premier League. They were captained by Sachin Tendulkar.

IPL

Standings
Mumbai Indians finished fifth in the league stage of IPL 2008.

References

2008 Indian Premier League
Mumbai Indians seasons